Godstone railway station is on the Redhill to Tonbridge Line and serves Godstone in Surrey, England. It is  measured from  via . It is approximately two miles south of the centre of the large semi-rural village, at South Godstone, an even more rural settlement overall in the civil parish which was entirely farmland until the coming of the railway, with a few scattered woodlands. The Bletchingley Tunnel, less than one mile due west of the station is about ½ mile long.
Tonbridge is not the natural terminus of the line, which continues straight to Ashford, Kent which has international links with France and Belgium.

History
The station was opened in 1842 by the South Eastern Railway.

The station became unstaffed in 1967 following which the original station buildings were demolished and replaced with small shelters.

In 1993 the line was electrified and services started to run through to London rather than being an extension of the Reading to Tonbridge North Downs Line service.

In 2007, a PERTIS machine was installed at the street entrance to the Tonbridge-bound platform. The station was until December 2008 operated by Southeastern before the Department for Transport approved the transfer suggested by Southern to its operations, whose green signage was installed before October 2008.

Facilities
The station is unstaffed and there is a self-service ticket machine available as well as information screens and help points for train information. Step-free access is available to the Tonbridge bound platform only at the station.

There is a small free car park and bicycle storage is available at the station.

Services
All services at Godstone are operated by Southern using Class 377 EMUs. 

The typical off-peak service in trains per hour is:
 1 tph to 
 1 tph to 

Services increase to 2 tph in each direction during the peak hours.

Bus Connections
The station is served by the Southdown PSV route 409 which provides connections to Selsdon, Caterham and East Grinstead.

References

External links

 

Railway stations in Surrey
DfT Category F2 stations
Former South Eastern Railway (UK) stations
Railway stations in Great Britain opened in 1842
Railway stations served by Govia Thameslink Railway
1842 establishments in England